Cvitović may refer to:

 Cvitović, Bosnia and Herzegovina, a village near Jajce, Bosnia
 Cvitović, Croatia, a village near Slunj, Croatia